Amedeo Lavini (24 October 1894 – 21 July 1961) was an Italian architect. His work was part of the architecture event in the art competition at the 1924 Summer Olympics. His father was Giuseppe Lavini, an Italian painter and art critic.

References

External links
 

1894 births
1961 deaths
19th-century Italian architects
20th-century Italian architects
Olympic competitors in art competitions
Architects from Turin